The first season of the American television sitcom series Cheers premiered on September 30, 1982, and concluded on March 31, 1983. It consisted of 22 episodes, each running approximately 25 minutes at length. The show was created and produced by director James Burrows and writers Glen and Les Charles, who previously worked on Taxi, another sitcom. Cheers was produced by Charles Burrows Charles Productions in association with Paramount Television. The concept and production design of the show were inspired by a public house in Boston, the Bull & Finch, which is now called Cheers Beacon Hill.

When it was first broadcast, critics praised the series as intelligent, sophisticated, cleverly written, well-cast, and well-timed. However, the Nielsen ratings for its original runs were very low. Typically, low ratings result in a show's cancellation, but before the season finale aired, the network renewed it for another season. Reruns of season 1 scored higher ratings than its first airing and the series earned award recognitions, including five Emmy Award wins in 1983. In later years, this season has still elicited positive reviews and is currently available on DVD.

Cast and characters 
This season introduces six characters:

 Sam Malone (Ted Danson)—a bartender, bar owner, and retired baseball player. Before the series premiered, his baseball career took a toll due to his alcoholism, so he became an owner and a bartender of Cheers.
 Diane Chambers (Shelley Long)—a college-educated, sophisticated academic who is jilted by her fiancé and left without money or a job. Diane is hired by Sam as a waitress. She proves to be pretentious, annoys customers with her long-winded speeches, and becomes the butt of their jokes.
 Carla Tortelli (Rhea Perlman)—a hard-working, "wisecracking, cynical waitress". Carla is a divorced mother of her ex-husband Nick's four children and then becomes pregnant with his fifth child. Diane and Carla do not get along and often insult each other.
 Ernie "Coach" Pantusso (Nicholas Colasanto)—an aging befuddled, "gravelly voiced" retired coach and co-bartender. Coach is vulnerable to other people's exploits, which puts the bar at stake. Coach and Sam take care of each other as father and son figures whenever help is needed. Nevertheless, he listens to people's problems and solves them with advice and analysis.
 Norm Peterson (George Wendt)—a semi-employed accountant and bar regular. Whenever Norm enters the bar, people yell out his name, "Norm!" Diane, however, always calls him by his full first name, "Norman", after everyone has already said "Norm!"
 Cliff Clavin (John Ratzenberger)—a postal worker and bar regular. Cliff is often present in the bar and his words confuse or irritate other people. (The actor Ratzenberger in this season was never credited in the opening title sequence but in ending credits of almost every episode. He would be billed in the opening sequence in subsequent seasons.)

Episodes 

Original air dates of episodes are not premiere dates for some areas of the United States. In those areas, episodes may have been broadcast at later dates, but these dates are not included in this article. This series' original time slot was 9:00pm (Eastern)/8:00pm (Central). In January 1983, it was moved to 9:30pm ET/8:30pm CT due to lineup changes.

<onlyinclude>

Specials
{{Episode table|background=#e38181|overall=|title=|writer=|director=|airdate=|episodes=
{{Episode list/sublist|Cheers (season 1)
| EpisodeNumber   = S01
| Title           = Super Bowl XVII Pregame segment
| RTitle          = 
| WrittenBy       = Ken Levine and David Isaacs
| DirectedBy      = James Burrows
| OriginalAirDate = 
| ShortSummary    = A short sketch, running under three minutes.  The gang is assembled at Cheers to watch the Super Bowl.  While Diane mocks the game, they all meet sportscaster Pete Axthelm.   

Aired as part of 1983's Super Bowl pre-game show.  Other NBC shows Remington Steele, Taxi, and The A-Team also produced sketches for that year's Super Bowl pre-game. This short sketch is not available on home video.

Nicholas Colasanto does not appear in this sketch.
| LineColor       = e38181
}}

}}</onlyinclude>

 Production 

Director James Burrows observed that this series is intended to be about the bar, where anybody comes in for any reason, not just drinks. The show was originally set in a hotel, a setting inspired by Fawlty Towers, Burrows's favorite British sitcom. The producers narrowed the setting down to a hotel bar, but later evolved it into a neighborhood bar in Boston, according to Glen Charles, "because it was more cozy". The "athletic element" was added to the bar because the show's creators, Burrows and Charles brothers (Glen and Les) were sports fans.

The show's bar setting was inspired by the Bull & Finch Pub in Boston. It was not filmed in the pub, but on the Stage 25 lot of Paramount Studios with the set decoration of Cheers. The Bull & Finch Pub was later renamed Cheers Beacon Hill. The entire season is set exclusively in the bar, its office, the bathroom, and the billiard room; no locations outside the bar were used until Diane Chambers' apartment is seen in the second season.

In the pilot episode's original script, there were only four principal characters: Sam Malone, Diane Chambers, Carla Tortelli, and Ernie "Coach" Pantusso. Norm Peterson and Cliff Clavin were absent from the original script. George Wendt and John Ratzenberger had auditioned for the role of George, a character who would have been included in the ending scene of the pilot episode with just one line, "Beer." Wendt was cast as George, who evolved into Norm Peterson, while a know-it-all character Cliff Clavin was added at Ratzenberger's suggestion. Therefore, influenced by the casting of Wendt and Ratzenberger, the pilot script was revised before production began on the show. Wendt became part of the program's regular cast and continued until it ended. Ratzenberger was credited in almost every episode for his recurring appearances in season 1, and he became part of the regular cast in the following season.

Sam Malone was supposed to be an ex-wide receiver for the New England Patriots football team, but Danson's casting led the program's writers to change Sam's former sporting role into a former relief pitcher for the Boston Red Sox baseball team. Nicholas Colasanto, director and actor who appeared in the 1980 film Raging Bull, was cast as Coach. About 1,000 actors who were not widely known were auditioned for these characters, and Stephen Kolzak was in charge of casting. According to Ted Danson, Perlman was the first actor to be hired for the show and was cast as Carla. Perlman had previously appeared in Taxi as the wife (ex-wife during the show's final season) of Louie de Palma, played by her husband Danny DeVito. Danson and Long were cast as a romantic duo.

At the time the show was being filmed, Rhea Perlman was pregnant. She told the producers during filming of the third of fourth episode (produced or aired), and the episodes were filmed out of sequence to allow Perlman to hide her pregnancy with a tray until the episode "Father Knows Last", after which Perlman's pregnancy was assimilated into her character Carla Tortelli, who was pregnant with her ex-husband Nick's child for the rest of the season. Perlman's daughter Lucy was born on March 12, 1983.

Drinks and snacks in the show were neither alcoholic nor edible. The scotch was made from water, the beer was non-alcoholic and was made out of "less lingering ingredients" with salt to produce a foam, and the cheese puffs were not real. The bathroom did not have toilets and sinks. Canned laughter was not used on the show; live audience reactions were recorded on film. From episode 13, each episode was preceded with the announcement, "Cheers is filmed before a live studio audience", and this continued during the remainder of the show's run.

NBC praised the show when the network was given test experiments and ordered initial thirteen episodes to be produced. The series' Nielsen ratings were low during this season, and the network tried to attract more viewers to the series. One episode was experimentally shot on videotape to lower production costs, but the producers were not satisfied with the results and continued to shoot the show on film. NBC also produced a scripted Super Bowl sketch with sportscaster Pete Axthelm, which was broadcast during the Super Bowl pre-game segment on January 30, 1983, along with sketches for other NBC shows, including The A-Team. After efforts to improve the ratings failed, NBC approved production of nine more episodes, and renewed the series for the next season.

Before "Where Everybody Knows Your Name", written by Gary Portnoy and Judy Hart Angelo became the show's theme song, Cheers producers rejected two of Portnoy's and Hart Angelo's songs. The songwriters had collaborated to provide music for Preppies an unsuccessful Broadway musical. When told they could not appropriate "People Like Us", Preppiess opening song, the pair wrote My Kind of People, intended to satirize "the lifestyle of old decadent old-money WASPs," but, to meet producers' demands, they rewrote the lyrics to be about "likeable losers" in a Boston bar. The show's producers rejected this song, as well as later songs that Portnoy and Angelo wrote. When Portnoy and Hart Angelo heard that NBC had commissioned thirteen episodes, they created "Where Everybody Knows Your Name", and rewrote the lyrics.

 Broadcasts Cheers was first broadcast at 9:00pm (Eastern) / 8:00pm (Central) on Thursday during fall 1982, which later became NBC's Must See TV, which followed the hour-long musical series Fame and preceded another half-hour sitcom Taxi, and hour-long crime series Hill Street Blues. Cheers was scheduled against CBS's Simon & Simon and ABC's Too Close for Comfort. Because of  poor Nielsen ratings, NBC changes its Thursday schedule. Critically acclaimed comedy Taxi moved to Saturdays; critically panned Gimme a Break! moved to Thursdays at 9pm ET/8pm CT and Cheers was moved to the 9:30pm ET/8:30pm CT slot, still competing against Simon & Simon and ABC's It Takes Two. Fame and Hill Street Blues remained in the same time slot. The overall performance of the season was 74th place out of "[ninety-nine] regularly scheduled shows".

Despite low ratings and unsuccessful attempts to improve them, NBC renewed Cheers for a second season, which it announced in March 1983. During mid-1983, reruns of the show's first season scored high ratings, most episodes reaching the top 20. "No Contest" was rerun on July 14, 1983, at 9:30pm ET/8:30pm CT and tied with Remington Steele in 12th place out of 65 programs in the ratings week of July 11, 1983. "Let Me Count the Ways" was rerun on May 26, 1983, and came 19th out of 63 programs with a 17.4 rating. "The Boys in the Bar" aired again on July 28, 1983, and scored a 12.8 rating and 23 share.

In Sydney, Australia, the first season aired on Sundays on Network Ten from November 1983 to April 8, 1984.

 Reception 

During the first broadcast of its first season in 1982–1983, Cheers received positive reviews. Rick Sherwood called it "ever-charming". Montreal critic Mike Boone from The Gazette called it "unpredictable" and the supporting characters "splendid". Fred Rothenberg of the Associated Press called it the "funniest, most adult comedy on TV".

Later reviews were more positive. Jason Bovberg from DVD Talk praised season 1's writing quality above its "odd assortment of [characters]" and gave its content four and a half stars out of five. Steve Butts from IGN called this season "some of the best comedy writing and acting seen on television", praised the cast's performances, and gave it nine out of ten points. Another IGN critic Cliff Wheatley called the pilot "Give Me a Ring Sometime" the ninth best Cheers episode and another episode "Truth or Consequences" fifth. Stephen Tropiano from PopMatters called it "fresh and very funny", even for a very old show, but said that some situations seem "forced", especially for customers with no connections to main characters. He also wrote that the show has "witty dialogue, talented ensemble, and a premise reminiscent of 1930s screwball comedies", which compared with the most popular sitcoms of the 1970s—Three’s Company, Laverne and Shirley, and The Love Boat—"Cheers was a welcome change of pace.".

Michael Speier from Variety magazine called it "clever and touching" with "fresh" stories and praised chemistry between Ted Danson and Shelley Long. Jonathan Boudreaux from the website TVDVDReviews.com wrote, "[w]hile the episodes are often outrageously funny, the show's humor is character-based. The laughs arrive from the personalities and foibles of the group rather than from wacky situations." He also wrote, "Cheers is probably one of the best TV series of all time." Elizabeth Skipper from DVD Verdict rated the story 90 percent and acting 95 percent and wrote, "[t]here's nothing terribly unique about the series; it's ...  fueled by the sexual tension between the two leads and fanned by a well-rounded supporting cast, a portrayal of the attempts of a downtown boy to win over an uptown girl—it's all been done before." Matt Brighton from Blu-ray Authority called the season's writing and directing "clever" and was "impressed at how this show has stood the test of time." TV Guide called "The Tortelli Tort" a "classic episode".

 Accolades 

The first season of Cheers received thirteen nominations for the Primetime Emmy Awards in 1983. It won five Emmy Awards, including an Outstanding Comedy Series. All the main cast except George Wendt, and John Ratzenberger, who was not part of the main cast, were nominated for, respectively, their own leading and supporting roles. Shelley Long won the award for Outstanding Lead Actress in a Comedy Series. Glen and Les Charles won an Outstanding Writing in a Comedy Series award for the pilot episode "Give Me a Ring Sometime". Episodes "The Boys in the Bar" and "Diane's Perfect Date" were nominated for the same category. James Castle and Bruce Bryant won an Outstanding Individual Achievement of Graphic Design and Title Sequences for "Showdown, Part One". James Burrows won an Outstanding Directing for a Comedy Series award for "Showdown, Part Two". The program's theme song, "Where Everybody Knows Your Name", was nominated for an Outstanding Achievement in Music and Lyrics award, but did not win.

The Television Critics Association voted Cheers the Best New Series of 1982–1983. Record no: 8302240041. The episodes "Give Me a Ring Sometime" and "The Boys in the Bar" won the Episodic Comedy category in the 36th Annual Writers Guild of America Awards in 1984. "The Spy Who Came In for a Cold One", and "Let Me Count the Ways" were nominated for the same award. James Burrows won the Comedy Series category of the 36th Annual Directors Guild of America Award (DGA) for "Showdown, Part Two" in 1984; he was DGA-nominated for "Sam at Eleven" but did not win in 1983.

On Saturday, January 29, 1983, Cheers won the Golden Globe Award for Best Musical or Comedy Television Series of 1982, and Shelley Long won a Golden Globe Award as the Best Supporting Actress in Television. Cheers did not win any Golden Globes for categories related to comedy television of 1983 at the 1984 ceremony. On Thursday, March 17, 1983, Cheers won the Favorite New Television Comedy Program award at the 9th Annual People's Choice Awards.

 DVD release 
Season 1 of Cheers was released on Region 1 DVD on May 20, 2003, twenty years after its season finale and ten years after the series finale, "One for the Road", were broadcast on television. Elizabeth Skipper of DVD Verdict rated video quality 80 percent and the sound quality 65 percent, but called the menu settings "ugly" and uninspiring, and the special features "lackluster" and consisting mostly of compilation clips of this season. Jonathan Boudreaux of TVDVDreviews.com found the video "clear and sharp", and found the sound quality similar to that of the television broadcast.

 Notes 

 References 
 
 

 Ratings notes 
According to Los Angeles Times, ratings from 1982 to 1983 were based on 83.3 million households with at least one television set. "Television Ratings" column list is located at Part VI, "Calendar" section. Below sources originated from Los Angeles Times, republished in microfilm copies, which may be located in your local library.

 External links 

 Production order of Cheers (season 1) at Copyright Catalog
 Click "Set Search Limits", select "<" that indicates less than (not equal to) a year number, select "Motion Pictures" at "Item Type", type "1984", either hit "Enter" or click "Set Search Limits"
 Then, after above step, search by title, type "Cheers", and hit "Enter" or click "Begin search"
 Cheers, season 1 at Internet Movie Database
 Cheers, season 1 at TV Guide''
 Cheers: The Complete First Season at Epinions
 Cheers, season 1 at Rotten Tomatoes

1
1982 American television seasons
1983 American television seasons
Television episodes directed by James Burrows